The Yas Island Formula 2 round is a FIA Formula 2 Championship series race that is run on the Yas Marina Circuit track in Abu Dhabi, United Arab Emirates.

Winners

See also
 Abu Dhabi Grand Prix

Notes

FIA Formula 2 Championship